Piotr Mroziński (born 24 August 1992) is a Polish footballer who plays as a midfielder for I liga side Puszcza Niepołomice.

References

External links
 
 

Polish footballers
Poland youth international footballers
1992 births
Living people
Ekstraklasa players
I liga players
II liga players
III liga players
Widzew Łódź players
Sandecja Nowy Sącz players
Wisła Płock players
Stal Mielec players
MKP Pogoń Siedlce players
Stal Stalowa Wola players
Puszcza Niepołomice players
People from Przemyśl
Association football midfielders